Nathan Kimsey (born 21 March 1993) is an English professional golfer. In 2022, he won the Rolex Challenge Tour Grand Final and the Challenge Tour Rankings.

Amateur career
Kimsey, from Woodhall Spa Golf Club in Lincolnshire, were an integral part of the England squad between 2010 and 2013. Highlights of his amateur career included selection for the Great Britain & Ireland 2011 Jacques Léglise Trophy, 2012 St Andrews Trophy and 2013 Walker Cup teams, and he formed part of the victorious England side at the 2013 European Amateur Team Championship in Denmark. 

He won the 2011 Peter McEvoy Trophy, and in 2013 he was runner-up at the St Andrews Links Trophy and won the Terra Cotta Invitational in Florida. At the Men's Home Internationals he became the first England player in 15 years to win all six matches, following which he went on to be a semi-finalist in the English Amateur.

Professional career
Kimsey turned professional in 2013 and spent two years on the Challenge Tour, before dropping down to the EuroPro Tour for the 2016 season. At the end of the year, he earned his European Tour card by becoming only the second player in history to win Qualifying School Final Stage after coming all the way through from Stage One, a total of 14 rounds of golf. 

In his rookie European Tour season, he finished top-10 at the Commercial Bank Qatar Masters and Australian PGA Championship, but returned to the Challenge Tour for 2018.

In 2022, Kimsey won the Le Vaudreuil Golf Challenge and the Rolex Challenge Tour Grand Final to become the Challenge Tour Rankings winner and earn promotion to the European Tour.

Amateur wins
2011 Peter McEvoy Trophy
2012 Darwin Salver
2013 Terra Cotta Invitational

Source:

Professional wins (2)

Challenge Tour wins (2)

Challenge Tour playoff record (1–0)

Team appearances
Amateur
Jacques Léglise Trophy (representing Great Britain and Ireland): 2011 (winners)
Men's Home Internationals (representing England): 2012
St Andrews Trophy (representing Great Britain and Ireland): 2012
European Amateur Team Championship (representing England): 2013 (winners)
Walker Cup (representing Great Britain & Ireland): 2013

Source:

See also
2016 European Tour Qualifying School graduates
2022 Challenge Tour graduates

References

External links

English male golfers
European Tour golfers
People from Boston, Lincolnshire
1993 births
Living people